Pritchardia limahuliensis, the Limahuli Valley pritchardia,  is a palm native to Hawaii. It is a rare species, only discovered in 1977 by staff of the National Tropical Botanical Garden in the Limahuli Garden and Preserve, Kauai, Hawaii, where it is now being conserved. It is threatened by introduced rats, which eat the seeds.

It is a medium-sized palm, growing to 10 m tall, with palmate (fan-shaped) leaves.

References

National Tropical Botanical Garden: Pritchardia limahuliensis

limahuliensis
Trees of Hawaii
Endemic flora of Hawaii
Biota of Kauai
Critically endangered plants